This is a list of motels. A motel is lodging designed for motorists, and usually has a parking area for motor vehicles. Entering dictionaries after World War II, the word motel, coined in 1925 as a portmanteau of motor and hotel or motorists' hotel, referred initially to a type of hotel consisting of a single building of connected rooms whose doors faced a parking lot and, in some circumstances, a common area; or a series of small cabins with common parking. Several large motel chains exist, while conversely others are small businesses with one location that are privately owned. The first motel in the world is the Motel Inn of San Luis Obispo, California.

Several historic motels are listed on the U.S. National Register of Historic Places, the United States federal government's official list of districts, sites, buildings, structures, and objects deemed worthy of preservation.

Motels

Motels that are listed on the U.S. National Register of Historic Places are denoted in the table below in the NRHP listed column.

See also

 Inn
 List of hotels in the United States
 List of largest hotels in the world
 Lists of hotels – an index of hotel list articles on Wikipedia
 Lodging
 Magic Fingers
 Motel era in Toronto

References

External links